Niman Ranch began in the early 1970s on an eleven-acre ranch in a small coastal town just north of San Francisco. They produce beef, lamb, and pork.

History

Early years
Niman Ranch was founded in 1969 by rancher William Ellis "Bill" Niman, a hippie and elementary school teacher, who has since left the company. He had moved from Minnesota to the small coastal town of Bolinas, California. There he purchased a ranch for $18,000 to begin a part-time pig, goat, and chicken farming operation.  His first cattle were acquired as trade for tutoring services.

Growth and investment
By 1994, the company had developed a reputation for high quality beef, but demand was exceeding the company's production capacity.  In 1994, Niman met Iowa pork farmer Paul Willis, and began private labeling Willis' pork under the name "Niman-Schell".

In 1997, Niman undertook an ambitious expansion aided by management changes and several million dollars of funding.  That year investors Rob Hurlbut and Mike McConnell became owner-partners and the company was renamed "Niman-McConnell". Hurlbut, a former manager of coffee for Nestle, became the CEO.  Orville Schell left to become dean of the UC Berkeley Graduate School of Journalism.  Subsequently, the company also accepted funding from Pacific Community Ventures, a community development venture capitalist itself funded in large part by the California Public Employees' Retirement System (CalPERS).

Revenues grew in the period, from $3 million in 1997 to $5 million in 1998, and $20 million in 2000, as Niman began to sell packaged meats in grocery stores.

Niman becomes a national brand
When Alice Waters opened her Chez Panisse restaurant in 1971, Bill Niman sent her pork for evaluation.  Waters agreed to buy pork from Niman, and included both the name and company logo on her menus.

In 2001 Niman entered an agreement to sell pork to the Chipotle Mexican Grill restaurant chain. To meet the demand, Paul Willis recruited hog farmers, mostly from the Midwest, to raise pigs under contract.

In 2005 Niman Ranch sold to more than 1,200 restaurants and restaurant groups.

In July 2006, Chicago-based Natural Food Holdings (part of Hilco Equity Partners) bought a major stake in the company; at the time, Niman Ranch was losing close to $3 million. In January 2009, due to bankruptcy Niman Ranch was merged into its chief investor.  The CEO at the time, Jeff Swain, said that the company is making $7,000 a week since Natural Food took over, rather than losing $10,000.

Embezzlement Scandal
In April 2010, former Niman Ranch treasurer Gary Steven Gross was indicted by a federal grand jury of defrauding the company of more than $1.6 million.

Bill Niman leaves Niman Ranch
In August 2007 Bill Niman left Niman Ranch after increasing confrontations with the new management team. Bill Niman is no longer part of the company and is forbidden to use his surname commercially.

Perdue buys Niman Ranch
In September 2015, Perdue Farms, a large privately owned poultry company, announced that it was buying Natural Food Holdings, the owner of Niman Ranch.

Niman Ranch becomes Certified Humane
Beginning September 1, 2016, all of Niman Ranch’s pork, beef, lamb and processed products, including bacon, sausages, hot dogs, and hams, became Certified Humane by the Humane Farm Animal Care program, making them the largest multi-protein company in the U.S. to join the program.

Footnotes

References

Further reading

External links

Agriculture companies of the United States
Companies based in Oakland, California
Food manufacturers of the United States
Meat processing in the United States
Brand name meats
Food and drink in the San Francisco Bay Area
Agriculture in California
Food and drink companies based in California